The British Atomic Scientists Association (ASA or BASA), was founded by Joseph Rotblat in 1946.

It was a politically neutral group, composed of eminent physicists and other scientists and was concerned with matters of British public policy regarding applications and dangers of nuclear physics (including nuclear weapons and nuclear power).

In so doing it also sought to inform fellow scientists and the public of the essential facts, usually via published papers and other documents.

Members 
The vice-president (VP) was the executive head while the president (P) was the
honorary position.

 Kathleen Lonsdale (VP, P 1967)
 Harrie Massey
 Nevill Mott
 Joseph Rotblat (VP 1946)
 Basil Schonland

See also 
 Atomic Energy Research Establishment
 Nuclear physics
 Pugwash group
 Science policy
 Franco-British Nuclear Forum

External links
 Founding, activities and fall of BASA

1946 establishments in the United Kingdom
1959 establishments in the United Kingdom
Defunct organisations based in the United Kingdom
Scientific organisations based in the United Kingdom
Nuclear technology in the United Kingdom
Nuclear organizations
Organizations disestablished in 1959
Scientific organizations established in 1946